Ned Swindell Porter (July 6, 1905 – June 30, 1968) was an American professional baseball player. He was a right-handed pitcher over parts of the 1926 and 1927 seasons with the New York Giants. For his career, he did not record a decision and compiled a 2.25 earned run average, with one strikeout in 4 innings pitched.

Porter was born in Apalachicola, Florida in 1905. He attended the University of Florida in Gainesville, Florida, where he played for coach James L. White and coach Lance Richbourg's Florida Gators baseball team from 1924 to 1926.

Porter died in Gainesville, Florida in 1968; he was 62 years old.

See also 

 List of Florida Gators baseball players

External links 

1905 births
1968 deaths
Accidental deaths in Florida
Albany Senators players
Baseball players from Gainesville, Florida
Birmingham Barons players
Chattanooga Lookouts players
Harrisburg Senators players
Florida Gators baseball players
Major League Baseball pitchers
Minor league baseball managers
Nashville Vols players
New York Giants (NL) players
People from Apalachicola, Florida
Scranton Miners players
Springfield Ponies players
Fulton Eagles players